Joseph Warren Revere may refer to:

 Joseph Warren Revere (businessman) (1777–1868), co-founder of the Revere Copper Company, son of Paul Revere
 Joseph Warren Revere (general) (1812–1880), US Civil War general and author, grandson of Paul Revere